The Huria Kristen Batak Protestan (HKBP, or Batak Christian Protestant Church in English") is a Lutheran church among the Batak people, generally the Toba Batak in Indonesia. It uses the Dutch Reformed style of worship due to the Dutch colonial heritage at the time it was founded. With a baptized membership of 4,500,000, it is one of the largest Protestant churches in Indonesia and Southeast Asia. Its present leader is Ephorus (Bishop) Robinson Butarbutar.

History

The first Protestant missionaries who tried to reach the Batak highlands of inner Northern Sumatra were English and American Baptist preachers in the 1820s and 1830s, but without any success. After Franz Wilhelm Junghuhn and Herman Neubronner van der Tuuk did intensive research on Batak language and culture in the 1840s, a new attempt was made in 1861 by several missionaries sent out by the German Rhenish Missionary Society (RMG). The first Bataks were baptized during this year. In 1864, Ludwig Ingwer Nommensen of the RMG reached the Batak region and founded a village called "Huta Dame" (village of peace) in the district of North Tapanuli Regency in Tarutung, North Sumatra.

The RMG was associated with the uniting churches also called a merged denomination that includes a Lutheran element. However, Nommensen and local leaders developed an approach that applied local custom to Christian belief.

In 1868, a local seminary for the education of teachers was opened in Sipirok, and in 1877 a seminary for the education of preachers was built in Pansurnapitu. 1881, Nommensen was officially nominated "ephorus" of the Batak congregations by the RMG. In 1885, the first Batak ministers were ordained in Pearaja Tarutung, where the HKBP headquarters is still located.

In 1889, the RMG sent out Hester Needham who started the work with girls and women and later established the first Batak deaconess. In the last quarter of the 19th century, further missionaries of the RMG were sent out to the other Batak tribes (Angkola, Dairi, Simalungun, Karo, and Pakpak).

In 1917, the "Hatopan Christen Batak" (HCB) which later became one of the nuclei for the independent Batak church, was founded in Tapanuli as a social movement.

In 1922, the first General Synod ("Sinode Godang") for all Batak congregations was held. In 1931 the HKBP became the first independent self-governing Christian body in what was then the Dutch East Indies.

In 1940, all Germans working for the RMG, including pastors and ministers, were detained by the Dutch government. The Rev. Sirait was chosen by the synod as the first indigenous ephorus of HKBP.

In 1952, while maintaining its indigenous character, the HKBP became a member of the Lutheran World Federation (LWF). In 1954, HKBP founded Nommensen University. In 1977, Sekolah Tinggi Theologia (STT or "Theological Seminary") HKBP split from Nommensen University.

Over the years, a number of church bodies have split from HKBP for various cultural and doctrinal reasons. However, HKBP remains the largest Indonesian LWF member by a factor of ten and also remains in communion with daughter church bodies through the LWF. Tarutung and the Batak region remain the stronghold for the HKBP in the predominantly Muslim nation of Indonesia, although worshippers are found throughout Indonesia and the United States.

Well known HKBP congregants include Amir Sjarifuddin (the only Christian prime minister of Indonesia), Todung Sutan Gunung (TSG) Mulia (the second Indonesian education minister), and General Tahi Bonar (TB) Simatupang.

In January 2010 two churches were burnt down in Sibuhuan.

Ecumenical relations 
HKBP is a member of and active participant in the World Council of Churches, Christian Conference of Asia, Lutheran World Federation, Asia Lutheran Communion, and Communion of Churches in Indonesia.

Agenda
The book of liturgical procedure used by the HKBP is referred to as the "Agenda" or formerly as the "Agende". This term comes from the European Protestant use of agenda.

Leaders

Ephoruses

General secretaries

Head of Koinonia Department

Head of Marturia Department

Head of Diakonia Department

See also
 Protestantism in Indonesia

References

External links

 
 
 Sekolah Tinggi Theologia (Theological Seminary) HKBP

1861 establishments in the Dutch East Indies
Batak
Lutheran denominations established in the 19th century
Lutheran World Federation members
Lutheranism in Indonesia
Religious organizations established in 1861